Pablo Cruz may refer to:
 Pablo Cruz (soccer) (born 1991), American soccer player
 Pablo Cruz (actor) (born 1984), Mexican actor

See also
 Pablo Cruise, American band